The Orobica or Valgerola is a breed of domestic goat from the Val Gerola in the province of Sondrio, in the Bergamo Alps of northern Italy. It is raised in the Val Gerola and the Valchiavenna in the province of Sondrio, in the Alto Lario Occidentale, the Valsassina and the Val Varrone in the province of Como, and in the upper Val Brembana in the Province of Bergamo. The origins of the breed are unknown; it is first documented at the beginning of the twentieth century. The Orobica is one of the eight autochthonous Italian goat breeds for which a genealogical herdbook is kept by the Associazione Nazionale della Pastorizia, the Italian national association of sheep-breeders.
Ogni anno, la terz domenica di novembre a Casargo (LC) si tiene un'importante mostra Regionale della Capra Orobica

At the end of 2013 the registered population was 1109.

Characteristics

The Orobica goat is of medium size; males weigh on average 80 kg, females about 65 kg. Both sexes have long horns and erect ears. The coat is lustrous, composed of fine long hair, with a colour varying from uniform ash-grey to violet-beige.

The Valgerola

Numbers are reported by the Associazione Nazionale della Pastorizia, but no data has ever been entered. There are two official breed standards, one for the "Razza Orobica" and the other for the "Orobica o Valgerola".

References

Goat breeds
Dairy goat breeds
Lombardy
Province of Sondrio
Province of Como
Province of Bergamo
Goat breeds originating in Italy